Serghei Botnaraș (born 27 February 1964 in Chișinău) is Moldovan football manager (coach) and former footballer who has played as goalkeeper.

Career
Since 2014 he was the assistant coach of Moldova national football team (under the rule of Alexandru Curteian), and previously has worked as goalkeepers coach of Moldova national under-21 football team, and was manager of Moldovan clubs CF Găgăuzia, FC Costuleni, and interim coach of Dacia Chișinău.

Botnaraș holds a UEFA A Manager License.

As footballer, he has played for Zimbru Chișinău in Divizia Națională and also played for Tiligul-Tiras Tiraspol, Zaria Bălți, and SK Odessa. He has played in a friendly match for Moldova national football team in 1992, against Congo, won 3-1.

References

External links
 
 

1964 births
Living people
Association football goalkeepers
Moldovan football managers
Moldovan footballers
Moldova international footballers
FC Dacia Chișinău managers
FC Zimbru Chișinău managers
SKA Odesa players
Moldovan expatriate footballers
Expatriate footballers in Ukraine
Moldovan expatriate sportspeople in Ukraine
Moldovan Super Liga managers